Grzegorz Tomala  (born 6 September 1974 in Gliwice) is a Polish footballer who plays as a goalkeaper for Przyszłość Rogów. Tomala made one appearance for the Poland national football team in 1999.

References

External links
 

1974 births
Living people
Sportspeople from Gliwice
Polish footballers
Poland international footballers
Odra Wodzisław Śląski players
Kolejarz Stróże players
GKS Jastrzębie players
Association football goalkeepers